Elections to the Shetland Islands Council were held on 2 May 1978 as part of Scottish regional elections, with 11 seats uncontested.  The election saw 14 new councillors enter the Shetland Islands Council, an unusually large number, in part attributable to the charged political context surrounding the devolution debate of the late 1970s.  Several of these incomers consisted of members of the pro-autonomy Shetland Group, later to become the Shetland Movement, and local Scottish National Party branch, registered as independents.

Aggregate results

Ward Results

By-elections since 1978

References

1978
Shetland